Gazera is a genus of moths within the family Castniidae. It was described by Gottlieb August Wilhelm Herrich-Schäffer in 1853, and contains the single species Gazera heliconioides. It is known from Brazil, Peru, Ecuador, Guyana, and French Guiana.

Subspecies
 Gazera heliconioides heliconioides
 Gazera heliconioides dodona
 Gazera heliconioides fassli
 Gazera heliconioides obidona
 Gazera heliconioides micha

References

Castniidae